The Egyptian vulture (Neophron percnopterus), also called the white scavenger vulture or pharaoh's chicken, is a small Old World vulture and the only member of the genus Neophron. It is widely distributed from the Iberian Peninsula and North Africa to India. The contrasting underwing pattern and wedge-shaped tail make it distinctive in flight as it soars in thermals during the warmer parts of the day. Egyptian vultures feed mainly on carrion but are opportunistic and will prey on small mammals, birds, and reptiles. They also feed on the eggs of other birds, breaking larger ones by tossing a large pebble onto them.

The use of tools is rare in birds and apart from the use of a pebble as a hammer, Egyptian vultures also use twigs to roll up wool for use in their nest. Egyptian vultures that breed in the temperate regions migrate south in winter while tropical populations are relatively sedentary. Populations of this species declined in the 20th century and some island populations are endangered by hunting, accidental poisoning, and collision with power lines.

Taxonomy and systematics 
The Egyptian vulture was formally described by the Swedish naturalist Carl Linnaeus in 1758 in the tenth edition of his Systema Naturae under the binomial name Vultur  percnopterus. The genus Neophron was created by Jules-César Savigny in the first natural history volume of the Description de l'Égypte (1809). The genus Neophron contains only a single extant species. A few prehistoric species from the Neogene period in North America placed in the genus Neophrontops (the name meaning "looks like Neophron") are believed to have been very similar to these vultures in lifestyle, but the genetic relationships are unclear. A fossil species Neophron lolis has been described from the late Miocene of Spain. The genus Neophron is considered to represent the oldest branch of the vultures which consists of separated (or polyphyletic) clades. Along with its nearest evolutionary relatives, the lammergeier (Gypaetus barbatus) and the palm-nut vulture (Gypohierax angolensis), they are sometimes placed in a separate subfamily, the Gypaetinae. 

Subspecies
There are three widely recognised subspecies of the Egyptian vulture, although there is considerable gradation due to movement and intermixing of the populations. The nominate subspecies, N. p. percnopterus, with a dark grey bill, has the largest range, occurring in southern Europe, northern Africa, the Middle East, Central Asia, and north-western India. Populations breeding in the temperate zone migrate south during winter. 

The Indian subcontinent is the range of subspecies N. p. ginginianus, the smallest of the three subspecies, which is identifiable by a pale yellow bill. The subspecies name is derived from Gingee in southern India from where the French explorer Pierre Sonnerat described it as Le Vautour de Gingi and it was given a Latin name by John Latham in his Index Ornithologicus (1790).

A small population that is found only in the eastern Canary Islands was found to be genetically distinct and identified as a new subspecies, N. p. majorensis in 2002. Known locally as the guirre they are genetically more distant from N. p. percnopterus, significantly greater even than N. p. ginginianus is from N. p. percnopterus. Unlike neighbouring populations in Africa and southern Europe, it is non-migratory and consistently larger in size. The subspecies name majorensis is derived from "Majorata", the ancient name for the island of Fuerteventura. The island was named by Spanish conquerors in the 15th century after the "Majos", the main native Guanche tribe there. One study in 2010 suggested that the species established on the island about 2,500 years ago when the island was first colonized by humans.

Nikolai Zarudny and Härms described a subspecies, rubripersonatus, from Baluchistan in 1902. This was described as having a deeper reddish orange skin on the head and a yellow-tipped dark bill. This has rarely been considered a valid subspecies but the intermediate pattern of bill colouration suggests intermixing of subspecies.

Etymology
The genus name is derived from Greek mythology. Timandra was the mother of Neophron. Aegypius was a friend of Neophron and about the same age. It upset Neophron to know that his mother Timandra was having a love affair with Aegypius. Seeking revenge, Neophron made advances towards Aegypius' mother, Bulis. Neophron succeeded and enticed Bulis into entering the dark chamber where his mother and Aegypius were to meet soon. Neophron then distracted his mother, tricking Aegypius into entering the chamber and sleeping with his own mother Bulis. When Bulis discovered the deception she gouged out the eyes of her son Aegypius before killing herself. Aegypius prayed for revenge and Zeus, on hearing the prayer, changed Aegypius and Neophron into vultures. "Percnopterus" is derived from Greek for "black wings": "περκνός" (perknos, meaning "blue-black") and πτερόν (pteron, meaning wing).

 Description 

The adult's plumage is white, with black flight feathers in the wings. Wild birds usually appear soiled with a rusty or brown shade to the white plumage, derived from mud or iron-rich soil. Captive specimens without access to soil have clean white plumage. It has been suggested as a case of cosmetic colouration. The bill is slender and long, and the tip of the upper mandible is hooked. The nostril is an elongated horizontal slit. The neck feathers are long and form a hackle. The wings are pointed, with the third primary being the longest; the tail is wedge shaped. The legs are pink in adults and grey in juveniles. The claws are long and straight, and the third and fourth toes are slightly webbed at the base.

The bill is black in the nominate subspecies but pale or yellowish in adults of the smaller Indian ginginianus. Rasmussen and Anderton (2005) suggest that this variation may need further study, particularly due to the intermediate black-tipped bill described in rubripersonatus. The facial skin is yellow and unfeathered down to the throat. The sexes are indistinguishable in plumage but breeding males have a deeper orange facial skin colour than females. Females average slightly larger and are about 10–15% heavier than males. Young birds are blackish or chocolate brown with black and white patches. The adult plumage is attained only after about five years.

The adult Egyptian vulture measures  from the point of the beak to the extremity of the tail feathers. The wingspan is about 2.7 times the body length. The Egyptian vulture is one of the smallest true Old World vulture, the only smaller species appears to be the marginally lighter palm-nut vulture (which may be an outlier from other vultures). Additionally, the hooded vulture is only scarcely larger than the Egyptian species.

 Distribution and movements 

Egyptian vultures are widely distributed across the Old World with their breeding range from southern Europe to northern Africa east to western and southern Asia. They are rare vagrants in Sri Lanka. They occur mainly on the dry plains and lower hills. In Armenia, breeding pairs have been found up to 2,300 meters a.s.l.

Most Egyptian vultures in the subtropical zone of Europe migrate south to Africa in winter. Vagrants may occur as far south as in South Africa although they bred in the Transkei region prior to 1923. They nest mainly on rocky cliffs, sometimes adopting ledges on tall buildings in cities and on large trees. Like many other large soaring migrants, they avoid making long crossings over water. Italian birds cross over through Sicily and into Tunisia making short sea crossings by passing through the islands of Marettimo and Pantelleria with rare stops on the island country of Malta. Those that migrate through the Iberian Peninsula cross into Africa over the Strait of Gibraltar while others cross further east through the Levant. In summer, some African birds fly further north into Europe and vagrants have been recorded in England, Ireland, and southern Sweden.

Migrating birds can sometimes cover  in a single day until they reach the southern edge of the Sahara,  from their summer home. Young birds that have not reached breeding age may overwinter in the grassland and semi-desert regions of the Sahel.

 Behaviour and ecology 

The Egyptian vulture is usually seen singly or in pairs, soaring in thermals along with other scavengers and birds of prey, or perched on the ground or atop a building. On the ground, they walk with a waddling gait. They feed on a range of food, including mammal faeces (including those of humans), insects in dung, carrion, vegetable matter, and sometimes small animals. When it joins other vulture species at a dead animal, it tends to stay on the periphery and waits until the larger species leave. Pairs may also scrounge for food from other vultures, particularly griffons. Recently fledged young will sometimes fly to other nests, competing with young vultures for food, stealing or even soliciting food from the (unrelated) adults bringing food. Wild rabbits (Oryctolagus cuniculus) form a significant part of the diet of Spanish vultures. In the Iberian Peninsula, landfills are an important food source, with the vultures more likely to occupy territories close to landfill sites. Studies suggest that they feed on ungulate faeces to obtain carotenoid pigments responsible for their bright yellow and orange facial skin. The ability to assimilate carotenoid pigments may serve as a reliable signal of fitness.

Egyptian vultures are mostly silent but make high-pitched mewing or hissing notes at the nest and screeching noises when squabbling at a carcass. Young birds have been heard making a hissing croak in flight. They also hiss or growl when threatened or angry.

Egyptian vultures roost communally on large trees, buildings or on cliffs. Roost sites are usually chosen close to a dump site or other suitable foraging area. In Spain and Morocco, summer roosts are formed mainly by immature birds. The favourite roost trees tended to be large dead pines. The number of adults at the roost increases towards June. It is thought that breeding adults may be able to forage more efficiently by joining the roost and following others to the best feeding areas. Breeding birds that failed to raise young may also join the non-breeding birds at the roost during June. Allopreening has been observed in Canarian Egyptian vultures between mated pairs of individuals as well as pairs of unrelated and same-sex individuals, particularly females.

Breeding
The breeding season is in spring. During the beginning of the breeding season, courting pairs soar high together and one or both may make steep spiralling or swooping dives. The birds are monogamous and pair bonds may be maintained for more than one breeding season and the same nest sites may be reused each year. The nest is an untidy platform of twigs lined with rags and placed on a cliff ledge, building, or the fork of a large tree. Old nest platforms of eagles may also be taken over. Nests placed on the ground are rare but have been recorded in subspecies N. p. ginginianus and N. p. majorensis.
Extra-pair copulation with neighbouring birds has been recorded and may be a reason for adult males to stay close to the female before and during the egg laying period. Females may sometimes associate with two males and all three help in raising the brood. The typical clutch consists of two eggs which are incubated in turns by both parents. The eggs are brick red with the broad end covered more densely with blotches of red, brown, and black. The parents begin incubating soon after the first egg is laid leading to asynchronous hatching. The first egg hatches after about 42 days. The second chick may hatch three to five days later and a longer delay increases the likelihood that it will die of starvation. In cliffs where the nests are located close to each other, young birds have been known to clamber over to neighbouring nests to obtain food. In the Spanish population, young fledge and leave the nest after 90 to 110 days. Fledged birds continue to remain dependent on their parents for at least a month. Once the birds begin to forage on their own, they move away from their parents' territory; young birds have been found nearly 500 km away from their nest site. One-year-old European birds migrate to Africa and stay there for at least one year. A vulture that fledged in France stayed in Africa for three years before migrating north in spring. After migrating back to their breeding areas, young birds move widely in search of good feeding territories and mates. The full adult plumage is attained in the fourth or fifth year. Egyptian vultures have been known to live for up to 37 years in captivity and at least 21 years in the wild. The probability of survival in the wild varies with age, increasing till the age of 2 and then falling at the age of 5. Older birds have an annual survival probability varying from 0.75 for non-breeders to 0.83 for breeding birds.
Tool use
The nominate population, especially in Africa, is known for its use of stones as tools. When a large egg, such as that of an ostrich or bustard, is located, the bird walks up to it with a large pebble held in its bill and tosses the pebble by swinging the neck down over the egg. The operation is repeated until the egg cracks from the blows. They prefer using rounded pebbles to jagged rocks. This behaviour, although believed to have been first reported by Jane Goodall in 1966, was actually already known to Africans and was first reported by J. G. Wood in 1877. However, this has only been reported in Africa and has not been recorded in N. p. ginginianus. Tests with both hand-reared and wild birds suggest that the behaviour is innate, not learnt by observing other birds, and elicited once they associate eggs with food and have access to pebbles. Their ability to deal with ostrich eggs is utilized by brown-necked ravens which form groups that wait for the eggs to be broken before collectively mobbing the vultures and engaging in kleptoparasitism. Another case of tool-use described from Bulgaria involves the use of a twig as a tool to roll up and gather strands of wool to use for lining the nest. 

Threats and conservation
Healthy adults do not have many predators, but human activities pose many threats. Collisions with power lines, hunting, intentional poisoning, lead accumulation from ingesting gunshot in carcasses, and pesticide accumulation take a toll on populations. Young birds at the nest are sometimes taken by golden eagles, eagle owls, and red foxes. Only rarely do adult birds attempt to drive away predators. Young birds that fall off of cliff ledges may be preyed on by mammalian predators such as jackals, foxes and wolves. Like all birds they serve as hosts for ectoparasitic birdlice including Aegypoecus perspicuus as well as organisms that live within them such as mycoplasmas.

Egyptian vulture populations have declined in most parts of its range. In Europe and most of the Middle East, populations in 2001 were half of those from 1980. In India, the decline has been rapid with a 35% decrease each year since 1999. In 1967–70, the area around Delhi was estimated to have 12,000–15,000 of these vultures, with an average density of about 5 pairs per 10 km2. The exact cause of the decline is not known, but has been linked with the use of the NSAID Diclofenac, which has been known to cause death in Gyps vultures.

In Italy, the number of breeding pairs declined from 30 in 1970 to 9 in the 1990s. Nearly all breeding failures were due to human activities. In Spain, which holds about 50% of the European population suggested causes of decline include poisoning by accumulation of lead, pesticides (especially due to large-scale use in the control of Schistocerca gregaria locust swarms), and electrocution. Windfarms may also pose a threat. Poorly designed power transmission lines in east Africa electrocute many wintering vultures. A shortage of carrion resulting from new rules for disposal of dead animals following the outbreak of Bovine Spongiform Encephalitis in parts of Europe during 2000 may have also had an effect on some populations. In Armenia direct persecution for trophy and for local illegal trade of animals as pets has been recorded.

The population of Egyptian vultures in the Canary Islands has been isolated from those in Europe and Africa for a significant period of time leading to genetic differentiation. The vulture population there declined by 30% in the ten years between 1987 and 1998. The Canarian Egyptian vulture was historically common, occurring on the islands of La Gomera, Tenerife, Gran Canaria, Fuerteventura, and Lanzarote. It is now restricted to Fuerteventura and Lanzarote, the two easternmost islands. The total population in 2000 was estimated at about 130 individuals, including 25–30 breeding pairs. Island birds also appear to accumulate significant amounts of lead from scavenging on hunted animal carcasses. The long-term effect of this poison at a sub-lethal level is not known, though it is known to alter the mineralization of their bones. In order to provide safe and uncontaminated food for nesting birds, attempts have been made to create "vulture restaurants" where carcasses are made available. However, these interventions may also encourage other opportunist predators and scavengers to concentrate at the site and pose a threat to vultures nesting in the vicinity.

 In culture 

The Bible makes a reference to the Egyptian vulture under the Hebrew name of rachamah/racham which has been translated into English as "gier-eagle".

In Ancient Egypt, several hieroglyphs include the Egyptian vulture including what is listed as G1 in the Gardiner's sign list - . The bird was held sacred to Isis and Mut in ancient Egyptian religion. The use of the vulture as a symbol of royalty in Egyptian culture and their protection by Pharaonic law made the species common on the streets of Egypt and gave rise to the name "pharaoh's chicken". The habit of coprophagy in Egyptian vultures gives them the Spanish names of "churretero" and "moñiguero", which mean "dung-eater". British sportsmen in colonial India considered them to be among the ugliest birds, and their habit of feeding on faeces was particularly despised. In British India they were known as "shawks" a contraction of shit-hawk. A southern Indian temple at Thirukalukundram near Chengalpattu was famed for a pair of birds that reputedly visited the temple for "centuries". These birds were ceremonially fed by the temple priests and arrived before noon to feed on offerings made from rice, wheat, ghee, and sugar. Although normally punctual, the failure of the birds to turn up was attributed to the presence of "sinners" among the onlookers. Legend has it the vultures (or "eagles") represented eight sages who were punished by Shiva, with two of them leaving in each of a series of epochs.

 Footnotes Cited works'

External links 

 BTO BirdFacts – Egyptian Vulture
 Egyptian Vulture species text in The Atlas of Southern African Birds.
 Egyptian Vulture – Global Raptor Information Network
 Ageing and sexing (PDF; 5.6 MB) by Javier Blasco-Zumeta & Gerd-Michael Heinze
 
 
 Armenian Bird Census Council

Egyptian vulture
Tool-using animals
Coprophagous animals
Birds of Southern Europe
Birds of Central Asia
Birds of South Asia
Birds of Western Asia
Birds of the Middle East
Birds of Africa
Birds of North Africa
Birds of Cape Verde
Birds of prey of Africa
Egyptian vulture
Egyptian vulture